Nutsa (Nino) Gogoberidze (also spelled Ghoghoberidze; born 1903 – died 1966) was a pioneering Georgian film director. She was an associate of Sergei Eisenstein and Alexander Dovzhenko. Her 1934 film Uzhmuri was the first Georgian feature film in the Soviet Union directed by a woman.

Life
Nino was born in Kakhi, Saingilo in 1903. She obtained a degree from the philosophy department of the University of Jena.

She married Levan Ghoghoberidze, a Communist party activist. In the 1930s, because of his activities, she was repressed. Following his execution in 1937, she was exiled for ten years. Upon her return, she abandoned the film industry and joined the Linguistics Institute in Tbilisi.

Her daughter Lana Gogoberidze and granddaughter Salome Aleksi-Meskhishvili are also film directors.

Gogoberidze died in Tbilisi in 1966.

Career
Gogoberidze's first film, Mati Samepo (Their Kingdom) was made with Mikhail Kalatozov.

In 1930, Gogoberidze released Buba (A Story of Mountainous Racha), a dramatised propaganda film. This was almost immediately shelved, and was not screened for decades. The reel remained with the Gosfilmofond, the Soviet (now Russian) film archive, and was handed over to the Georgians in 2016.

Filmography
 Mati Samepo (Their Kingdom, 1928) (with Mikhail Kalatozov)
 Buba (1930, with David Kakabadze)
 Uzhmuri (1934)

References 

1903 births
1966 deaths
Soviet film directors
Film directors from Georgia (country)
Soviet expatriates in Germany